Nausheen Shah is a Pakistani actress. She is known for playing the character of Dua in the acclaimed series Pani Jaisa Piyar (2013) and Noor Jehan in Hum TV's Rehaai (2013). Her other notable appearances include Mera Pehla Pyar (2012), Sartaj Mera Tu Mera (2014), Mann Chalay (2014), Khud Parast (2018) Deewar-e-Shab (2019) and Tarap (TV series) (2020). She will also be seen in the upcoming film Jhol .

Career
Shah's career began with modeling. She has appeared in popular TV advertisements for companies such as Warid Telecom, Habib Bank and First Women's Bank.

She later started acting and appeared in popular television drama serials such as Shaista Shaista, Mannchalay, Rehaai and Pani Jaisa Piyar. Shah will make her film debut in the upcoming Jhol, in which she will play the character of Chandani (wife of Ali Azmat's character).

Filmography
Film

Television

Other appearancesQissa Chaar DarveshDiya Jalaye RakhnaAik Safar TanhaiPyar KahaniJo Baat Ghar Mein Hai''

References

External links
 
 

Pakistani television actresses
Pakistani female models
Living people
Year of birth missing (living people)